Frederick Stuart Greene (1870 - March 26, 1939), was Superintendent of Public Works of New York State.

Greene was an outspoken opponent to the scope of the United States Numbered Highways system during its planning.

References

1870 births
1939 deaths
New York State Superintendents of Public Works